Barakāt ibn ʿUmar Dīn, reigned 1555–1559, was a nominal sultan of the Sultanate of Adal in the Horn of Africa. A son of Umar Din and a brother of Ali ibn Umar Din, he was the last known member of the Walashmaʿ dynasty.

In 1555, Barakat and Ali Jamal ibn al-Imam Ahmad led an army into Dawaro with the intent of taking it from the Ethiopians. However, he was defeated by the Governor of Dawaro. When Nur ibn Mujahid invaded the Ethiopian Empire in 1559, sultan Barakat held Harar against the army of Hamalmal, who had been sent there by his cousin, Emperor Gelawdewos. Dejazmatch Halmalal and Ras Fasil killed him and sacked the city.

References

Sultans of the Adal Sultanate
16th-century monarchs in Africa
Year of death unknown
Year of birth unknown
16th-century Somalian people